Eysenhardtia polystachya, the kidneywood, is a tree from Mexico, growing along forest edges and water courses at elevations of 150–3000 m. Previously it was used as a source of lignum nephriticum.

References

polystachya
Flora of Mexico